Mongo's Back in Town is a 1971 crime made-for-television film, directed by Marvin J. Chomsky, with Telly Savalas, Joe Don Baker and Martin Sheen. It was released in some regions under the title Steel Wreath.

Plot 

Telly Savalas plays the role of police Lieutenant Pete Tolstad, a role very similar to his later title role on his TV series Kojak. Joe Don Baker is Mongo Nash, a professional killer hired by his brother, a gang boss, to wipe out a rival gangster, and the hit man is the one Tolstad must stop.

Cast

References 
International television almanac by Richard Gertner

External links

CBS network films
Films directed by Marvin J. Chomsky
1971 films
1970s English-language films